Maxime Hamou (born 8 June 1995) is a French tennis player. Hamou has a career-high ATP singles ranking of No. 211, achieved in July 2015 and a career-high ATP doubles ranking of No. 744, achieved in July 2016.

Hamou achieved a career-high ITF junior ranking of No. 8 in May 2013.

Career
Hamou made his main draw ATP debut at the 2015 Open de Nice Côte d'Azur. He then made his Grand Slam main draw debut at the 2015 French Open where he received a wild card into the singles event.

He won an ITF doubles tournament in 2017 in Morocco, with Elliot Benchetrit.

2017 sexual assault incident
Hamou qualified to the main draw of the 2017 French Open. After being defeated in straight sets by Pablo Cuevas in the first round, Hamou groped and kissed Eurosport journalist Maly Thomas on live television, despite her clear discomfort. As a result, Hamou was suspended for the rest of the French Open, with the French Tennis Federation saying: "The management of the tournament has decided to revoke Maxime Hamou’s accreditation following his reprehensible behavior with a journalist yesterday". 

Maly Thomas later declared that "if they weren't live she would have given him a right hook". Hamou apologized for his behaviour via his Instagram account the following day. He was excluded though from the 2017 French Open.

References

External links
 
 

1995 births
Living people
French male tennis players
Sportspeople from Nîmes
French sportspeople of Algerian descent